Giorgos (or Yorgos) Arvanitis (born February 22, 1941) is a Greek cinematographer.

Life

Arvanitis was born in the village of Dilofo, Phthiotis, Greece. Having received an education as an electrician in the construction sector, he started working in the movies business in his early 20s, advancing from 2nd camera assistant to finally become a director of photography.

Career
Arvanitis has been an important figure in the Greek film industry, having worked on many films produced by Finos Films. In 1968, he worked on Theo Angelopoulos's first short film Εκπομπή (Broadcast). Since then, he has worked in every single one of Angelopoulos' movies, including award-winning Eternity and a Day (Palme d'or, Cannes 1998), except for the very last trilogy he was shooting (Trilogy: The Weeping Meadow, The Dust of Time, The Other Sea).

During his career, his has worked with some of the greatest Greek directors such as Dinos Katsouridis, Pantelis Voulgaris, Michael Cacoyannis (Iphigenia (1977) with Irene Papas), Jules Dassin (Cri de femmes (1978) with Melina Mercouri). In 1989, he moved to France with his wife and three sons looking for a brighter future at a time when the total number of Greek movies was in decline. The same year, he received the Osella for Best Cinematography at the Venice International Film Festival for the movie Australia directed by Jean-Jacques Adrien. Since then he has worked with directors such as Volker Schlöndorff (Homo Faber (1991)), Jean-Pierre and Luc Dardenne, Marco Bellochio (Il sogno della farfalla for which he received the Best Photography prize at the Gramado in 1994), Goran Paskaljevic (Someone Else’s America (1994)), Marco Ferreri, Bruno Podalydès, Agnieszka Holland (Total Eclipse with Leonardo DiCaprio), Amos Gitai, Nikos Panayiotopoulos<ref>[http://www.ekathimerini.com/4dcgi/news/civ__10404531KathiLev&xml/&aspKath/civ.asp?fdate=29/10/2002 Good intentions but no true cinematic vivacity Kathimerini October 29, 2002 ]</ref> and the very controversial Catherine Breillat.
He is a member of the Association Française des directeurs de la photographie Cinématographique.

 Filmography 
 1967 : Oi Thalassies oi Hadres 1970 : Reconstitution 1970 : Ipolochagos Natassa 1972 : Days of '36 1975 : Assault on Agathon 1975 : The Travelling Players 1977 : Iphigenia 1977 : The Hunters 1978 : A Dream of Passion 1980 : Alexander the Great 1983 : Homecoming Song 1984 : Voyage to Cythera 1986 : The Beekeeper 1988 : Landscape in the Mist 1989 : Australia 1991 : The Suspended Step of the Stork 1991 : Voyager 1994 : The Butterfly's Dream 1995 : Ulysses' Gaze 1995 : Total Eclipse 1997 : Bent 1997 : Port Djema 1998 : Eternity and a Day 1998 : Train of Life 1999 : Innocent 1999 : Romance 2001 : Fat Girl 2002 : Kedma 2004 : Process 2004 : Brides 2004 : Anatomy of Hell 2005 : See You at Regis Debray 2005 : The Great Ecstasy of Robert Carmichael 2006 : A Crime 2007 : The Last Mistress 2008 : Dorothy Mills 2015 : Graziella, directed by Mehdi Charef, starring Rossy de Palma
 2019 : Adults in the Room 2019 : Fanny Lye Deliver'd International awards and honours 
He has received numerous prizes for his work including (non-exhaustive list):
Thessaloniki Film Festival, Greek cinema awards, Best photography for Nyfes (2004), Doxombous (1988), Mia toso makrini apousia (1985), O Thiassos (1974), Meres tou 36 (1972), Anaparastassi (1970)
Golden Bayard at the Namur International Festival of French-Speaking Film for Faraw! (1997)
Nomination for the Camerimage Golden Grog for 'Ulysses' Gaze' (1995) and for Eternity and a Day together with Andreas Sinanos (1998)
Golden Kikito at the Gramado Film Festival for Il Sogno della farfalla (1994)
Osella for Best Cinematography at the Venice Film Festival (Mostra Internazionale d'Arte Cinematografica) for Australia (1989)
Best Photography award, Chicago Film Festival for Topio stin omichli'' (1988)
Golden Camera 300 for life achievement at the Manaki Brothers Film Festival (2019)

References

External links 

1941 births
Living people
Greek cinematographers
Greek film producers
Film people from Athens